The 2001–02 League of Wales was the tenth season of the League of Wales since its establishment in 1992. It began on 17 August 2001 and ended on 20 April 2002. The league was won for the second consecutive season by Barry Town, their sixth title overall.

League table

Results

References

Cymru Premier seasons
1
Wales